The Rumours tour was a concert tour by Fleetwood Mac, after the release of the band's eleventh album with the same title in February 1977. Due to the album's success Fleetwood Mac embarked on a world tour taking in North America, Europe, their native UK, Japan and Oceania.

Taking a break from the recording sessions for their follow-up album Tusk, the band went back on the road in the summer of 1978, playing arenas and stadiums in the United States. This leg of the tour was called "The Penguin Summer Country Safari".

Setlist

Tour dates

Box office score data

Notes

Personnel
 Mick Fleetwood – drums, cowbell, congas, wind chimes, gong, talking drum
 John McVie – bass guitars
 Christine McVie – Hammond B3 organ, Hohner Pianet, Fender Rhodes, piano, maracas, vocals
 Lindsey Buckingham – acoustic and electric guitars, vocals
 Stevie Nicks – vocals, tambourine, cowbell
 Additional Personnel
 Ray Lindsey – rhythm guitar on "Go Your Own Way", and "Second Hand News"

References

1977 concert tours
Fleetwood Mac concert tours
1978 concert tours